Thalassodes veraria (or Pelagodes veraria), is a moth of the family Geometridae first described by Achille Guenée in 1858. It is found in Sri Lanka, Fiji, India, Java, Malaysia, New Guinea and Australia.

The species' wingspan is about 3 cm. It is a greenish moth with two faint pale zigzag lines across each wing. Costa yellowish. Each hindwing has an angular margin. The caterpillar feeds on Mangifera indica, Chrysanthemum, Dendranthema, Lagerstroemia speciosa, Litchi chinensis, Rosa indica and other Rosa species.

References

External links
Redescription of Thalassodes antithetica Herbulot, 1962, an endemic moth from Inner Seychelles

Moths of Asia
Moths described in 1858
Geometridae